The Toybob is a breed of small and compact cats with short kinked tails that were first documented in Russia in the late 1980s. It is often considered to be "the smallest breed of cat" due to a spontaneous mutation.

Recognition 
In 2009 the Toybob was placed by The International Cat Association (TICA) the into the "Experimental" category. In January 2017 the Toybob was given "Registration" status by TICA, allowing for registration facilities but with no guarantee of further advancement.

References

Cat breeds originating in Russia
Cat breeds